Johannes Voges 'Aranos' Coetzee (born 14 March 1988) is a Namibian rugby union player for the  in the Pro14 and the  in the Currie Cup. His regular position is prop.

Career

Youth / Western Province

Coetzee was born in Windhoek and went to primary school in Aranos before moving to South Africa to attend Hoër Landbouskool Boland in Paarl. He was selected to represent  at the 2006 Academy Week and was subsequently included in a South Africa team that participated at the Under-18 Africa Cup.

Leopards / NWU Pukke

After high school, Coetzee moved to Potchefstroom, where he represented the s in the 2008 and 2009 Under-21 Provincial Championships.

Coetzee played Varsity Cup rugby for  during the 2010 Varsity Cup competition, making eight appearances as he helped Pukke reach the semi-finals of the competition for the third consecutive season, where they lost to eventual champions .

Racing Métro 92

After the 2010 Currie Cup Premier Division, Coetzee moved to France, where he joined Top 14 side . He made a single appearance for them off the bench during the 2010–11 Top 14 season. In 2011–12, he played for them on seven occasions and also made his first start for them against , helping them to finish in sixth spot on the log. He also played in the Heineken Cup competition for the first time, making four appearances as Racing Metro failed to progress from Pool 2; this included one start in their match against Edinburgh.

Brive

Coetzee made fifteen appearances for Brive in the 2013–14 Top 14 season as they finished in ninth spot on the log. He made another seven appearances in the 2013–14 European Challenge Cup, where he helped them to top Pool 3 with five wins and a draw to qualify for the Quarter Finals, where they lost 7–39 to English Premiership side Bath.

Coetzee's involvement in 2014–15 was more limited, playing in nine matches during their Top 14 season as they narrowly avoided relegation, finishing in tenth spot, but just one log point ahead of relegated . He also played in four matches in their European Rugby Challenge Cup campaign that saw them lose all six their matches.

Free State Cheetahs

International

In 2006, Coetzee represented South Africa at the Under-18 Africa Cup.

However, he switched allegiances to his country of birth, and made his test debut for them on 6 June 2015 in their 2015 Africa Cup match against  in Nabeul.

Coetzee was also named in a 50-man Namibian training squad prior to the 2015 Rugby World Cup.

References

1988 births
Living people
CA Brive players
Cheetahs (rugby union) players
Free State Cheetahs players
Leopards (rugby union) players
Namibia international rugby union players
Namibian Afrikaner people
Namibian rugby union players
Racing 92 players
Rugby union players from Windhoek
Rugby union props
White Namibian people
Bath Rugby players